Tara Correa-McMullen (born Tara McMullen; May 24, 1989 – October 21, 2005) was an American actress.  She played gang member Graciela Reyes on the CBS TV series Judging Amy. On October 21, 2005, she was shot dead in front of an apartment complex in Inglewood, California.

Early life
Tara Correa-McMullen was born in Westminster, Vermont to mother Mary Devra Correa and father Thomas McMullen. In 1996, she, her mother, and her older sister Abigail moved to Southern California, and later settled in Venice, an affluent neighborhood of Los Angeles. Correa-McMullen attended Claremont Middle School and later Venice High School, where she sang in the school's choir.

Career
Correa-McMullen's only film role was in the 2005 film Rebound, when her mother, who was working for a casting company at the time, recommended her daughter for the role. Correa-McMullen had no acting experience prior to landing the role. She later won a part as a recurring character on the CBS TV series Judging Amy as a young gang member, and she appeared in several episodes during the series' sixth season. Correa-McMullen also had a small role on one episode of the hit Nickelodeon television series Zoey 101.

Murder
In early 2005, 16-year-old Correa-McMullen moved into her own apartment in Inglewood, California and began dating a  gang member ten years her senior. On the evening of October 21, 2005, she was shot to death by gang member Damien Watts. At the time of her death, Correa-McMullen was outside her apartment complex and was trying to run inside for safety. Two other people were also shot in the incident, but survived. She is interred at Forest Lawn Memorial Park in the Hollywood Hills of Los Angeles.

Aftermath
Damien Watts was charged with one count of murder and two counts of attempted murder on March 1, 2006. On January 23, 2009, he was convicted of Correa-McMullen's murder. Watts was sentenced to five life sentences without parole on February 27, 2009. Watts' accomplice in the shooting spree, Joseph Wayne Jones, was also sentenced to life without parole.

In 2007, Tara Correa-McMullen was profiled on the E! documentary series Boulevard of Broken Dreams.

References

External links

1989 births
2005 deaths
2005 murders in the United States
People from Westminster (town), Vermont
21st-century American actresses
Actresses from Los Angeles
Actresses from Vermont
American child actresses
American film actresses
American television actresses
People from Venice, Los Angeles
Murder in California
People murdered in California
Deaths by firearm in California
Murdered American children
Burials at Forest Lawn Memorial Park (Hollywood Hills)
20th-century American actresses